Bagnolo Cremasco is a comune in the province of Cremona, in Lombardy, northern Italy.

References 

Cities and towns in Lombardy